Sir Thomas Penberthy Bennett KBE FRIBA (14 August 1887 – 29 January 1980) was an English architect, responsible for much of the development of the new towns of Crawley and Stevenage.

Biography

Early life
Thomas Bennett was born in 1887 in Paddington, London. He trained as an architect at Regent Street Polytechnic while employed in the drawing office of the London and North Western Railway. He went on to study at the Royal Academy Schools.

Career
He joined the Office of Works (later Ministry of Works) in 1911. A career in both education and government followed, until setting up his own practice known as TP Bennett in 1921. In 1922, he became a Fellow of the Royal Institute of British Architects.

In 1940, he became Director of Bricks at the Ministry of Works, where he was awarded the CBE in 1942, but returned to private practice immediately after the Second World War. He was knighted in 1946. 

His practice was responsible for many landmark buildings such as the Saville Theatre, Esso House, John Barnes Department store, Hampstead (since 1986, a branch of Waitrose), Westminster Hospital, a BOAC air terminal, the London Mormon Temple in Surrey, Smithfield Poultry Market in London, and Hawkins House in Dublin.

In 1947, he was appointed as the Chairman of the Development Corporation of Crawley New Town, in West Sussex, a post he held until 1960. In his early days at the Development Corporation, he was responsible for the scrapping of the existing plans for the New Town, and the appointment of Sir Anthony Minoprio to create a new master plan. When the town was built, a new comprehensive school was named for him, opening in 1958. He also took over responsibility for the Stevenage New Town which had been initially the responsibility of Monica Felton.

After the completion of Crawley New Town, in 1958 Sir Thomas Bennett designed the terraced houses (1-14) on Middle Field, St John's Wood, which the 20th Century Society have recognised as well-preserved mid-century reinterpretation if the Georgian Terrace. He opened the Thomas Bennett Community College school in Tilgate, Crawley, officially in November 1959. After a section of the original Smithfield Poultry Market was destroyed by fire in 1958, Bennett designed its replacement, built between 1961-63 and with a unique concrete shell domed roof, believed to be the largest in Europe at the time. In 1964 he designed the Crawley Chapel of the Church of Jesus Christ of Latter-day Saints. Other T.P. Bennett buildings are the UK Ford HQ at Warley (1965) and the Forton motorway service station (1965).

He was awarded the KBE in 1954. His private practice, T.P. Bennett and Son, expanded into an architectural company and in 1967 was passed to his only son, P.H.P.Bennett, CBE, Chairman of the Joint Contracts Tribunal 1973–1978.

Partial list of buildings

Marsham Court, Marsham Street, City of Westminster (1937)
Saville Theatre, Shaftesbury Avenue, London Borough of Camden (1931)
Esso House, Victoria Road, Victoria (1962)
John Barnes department store, Hampstead (1935)
Terraced houses on Middle Field, St John's Wood (1958)
Hyde Park Chapel, South Kensington, Royal Borough of Kensington and Chelsea (1961)
Smithfield Poultry Market, London (1963)
London Temple, Newchapel, Surrey (1960)
Hawkins House, Dublin

Death
He died on 29 January 1980.

References

Further reading
Gontran Goulden, ‘Bennett, Sir Thomas Penberthy (1887–1980)’, rev. Kaye Bagshaw, Oxford Dictionary of National Biography, Oxford University Press, 2004 accessed 24 Oct 2007

External links
 TP Bennett

Architects from London
Fellows of the Royal Institute of British Architects
Knights Commander of the Order of the British Empire
Alumni of the University of Westminster
Alumni of the Royal Academy Schools
Architects of Latter Day Saint religious buildings and structures
1887 births
1980 deaths